Gábor Árva (born 1948) is a Hungarian sprint canoer who competed in the early 1970s. He won two medals at the 1975 ICF Canoe Sprint World Championships  in Belgrade with a gold in the C-2 1000 m and a bronze in the C-2 500 m events.

References

Hungarian male canoeists
Living people
ICF Canoe Sprint World Championships medalists in Canadian
1948 births
20th-century Hungarian people